Mukhsin is a 2006 Malaysian film directed by Yasmin Ahmad. It is the third instalment in the "Orked" trilogy. Shot in just 12 days, it won one award and one special mention at the 57th Berlin International Film Festival (2007) under the children's film category: International Jury of Generation Kplus - Grand Prix of the Deutsches Kinderhilfswerk for Best Feature Film and the Generation Kplus Children’s Jury Awards - Special Mention. Within the first 4 days of its release in Malaysia, it earned RM700,000 in box-office takings. It went on to have a final gross of almost RM2 million.

Plot
The story takes place in Sekinchan, Sabak Bernam in 1993, revolving around the first love of a 10-year-old Orked when a 12-year-old boy, Mukhsin, comes with his older brother and aunt to spend the school holidays in her village.

Around this relatively simple plotline of a blossoming young romance between the film's two young protagonists, are interweaved scenes of Malaysian village life and the dynamics of different types of families. Most of the family scenes revolve around Orked, her parents Mak Inom and Pak Atan, and the family's close maid Kak Yam who is almost like a family member.

The other families which are given attention in the movie are Mukhsin's family (with his elder brother who has lost his way in life and is trying desperately to find their mother who abandoned them at a young age, and their Aunty who is trying to take care of the two boys as though they were her own), and Orked's neighbours (with the young daughter and pregnant mother who are critical of the western ways of Orked's family, while they themselves are hurt by the father who wants to abandon them to take on a second wife).

Cast
 Mukhsin - Syafie Naswip
 Orked - Sharifah Aryana
 Mak Inom - Sharifah Aleya Binti Syed Zainal Rashid Yahya
 Kak Yam - Adibah Noor
 Pak Atam - Irwan Iskandar
 Adult Orked - Sharifah Amani

Music
 "Keroncong Hujan", performed by Adibah Noor
 "Ne me quitte pas" (Don't leave me) by Nina Simone

References

External links
 
 Awards List from 57th Berlin International Film Festival, 2007
 Cinema Online Article
 Movie summary from program for 57th Berlin International Film Festival, 2007
 Think.com movie review
 Movie Information at Malaysian cinema website
 Review: mukhsin - orked’s first and memorable love
 New York Times review

2006 films
Films directed by Yasmin Ahmad
Malay-language films
2000s Mandarin-language films
2006 comedy-drama films
2006 comedy films
Malaysian comedy-drama films
2000s English-language films